Max Roach + 4 at Newport is a live album by American jazz drummer Max Roach recorded at the Newport Jazz Festival in 1958 and released on the EmArcy label.

Track listing
 "La Villa" (Kenny Dorham) - 6:19    
 "A Night in Tunisia" (Dizzy Gillespie, Frank Paparelli) - 8:20    
 "Deeds, Not Words" (Bill Lee) - 4:28    
 "Minor Mode" (Booker Little) - 5:30    
 "Tune-Up" (Eddie "Cleanhead" Vinson) - 5:21    
 "Love for Sale" (Cole Porter) - 9:57

Personnel 
Max Roach - drums
Booker Little - trumpet
George Coleman - tenor saxophone
Ray Draper - tuba 
Art Davis - bass

Reception 
In his review for AllMusic, Scott Yanow rated the album 4 of 5 stars, stating, "The main reason to search for this out-of-print LP is for the playing of the great, if short-lived, trumpeter Booker Little who was the first on his instrument to emerge from the shadow of Clifford Brown and start to develop his own voice... The quintet performs six consistently enjoyable and hard-swinging numbers."

References 

1958 live albums
Max Roach live albums
EmArcy Records live albums
Albums recorded at the Newport Jazz Festival
1958 in Rhode Island